Sebastiano Ruocco (born May 16, 1966), better known by his stage name Ice One, is an Italian rapper, beatmaker and writer from Turin, Italy. Ice One is one of the pioneers of Italian underground hip hop, having started to perform in 1982.

During his career, Ice One worked with two of the most important Italian hip hop groups of the nineties, Colle der Fomento (founded with Danno & Masito, 1994-1999) and Assalti Frontali (1999).

Discography
Albums
 B-Boy Maniaco (1995)
 Crescendo: The Dark Side of Funk (1996)
 Odio pieno (as Colle der Fomento) (1996)
 Scienza doppia H (as Colle der Fomento) (1999)
 Banditi (as Assalti Frontali) (1999)
 Medicina buona (as La Comitiva) (1999)
 Latte & sangue (with Don Diegoh) (2015)

EPs
 Power 2 the People (as Power MC) (1991)
 Word Up (as Fluydo) (2006)

External links
 

1966 births
Living people
Musicians from Turin
Italian rappers